Enrique Guerra (1871–1943) was a Mexican sculptor from Xalapa, Veracruz.

Career
He studied painting under José María Velasco, sculpting under Miguel Noreña and was influenced by poet Rubén Darío. Over his lifetime, the artist created a large number of works, many of which were monumental in size, creating that way for maximum effect of his relatively simple but energetic compositions. He spent some time in Paris, which can be seen in works such as Asesinato de Cesár, Coroliano, Thais, Crisálida, Caín y Abel, La caza del oso and Mendigo. All of these works received honors. In Mexico, his large sculptures of bronze or stone at the various buildings of the Secretariat of Foreign Affairs  and include depictions of Benito Juárez and José María Liceaga Cornelio Ortiz de Zárate. Another well-known work is called Las Cuatro Virtundes which was created from Carrara marble.

References

1871 births
1943 deaths
Mexican sculptors
Artists from Veracruz
People from Xalapa